The Dwayne McDuffie Award for Diversity in Comics is given to an American comic book that is committed to diversity and inclusion. It is named in honour of Dwayne McDuffie, a creator known for his work writing, editing, and producing comics and animation.

The nominees and winner are chosen by a selection committee of comics and animation professionals.

History 

Neo Edmund came up with the idea for the award. It is presented at Long Beach Comic Expo.

Comics and TV writer Matt Wayne was the initial director of the award.

Well known voice actor Phil LaMarr acts as Master of Ceremonies for the award presentation.

Award winners and nominees

References

2015 establishments in the United States
Annual events in the United States
Awards established in 2015
Comics awards
African-American comics